The canton of Aurec-sur-Loire is an administrative division of the Haute-Loire department, south-central France. Its borders were modified at the French canton reorganisation which came into effect in March 2015. Its seat is in Aurec-sur-Loire.

It consists of the following communes:
Aurec-sur-Loire
Pont-Salomon
Saint-Ferréol-d'Auroure
Saint-Just-Malmont

References

Cantons of Haute-Loire